George Cook is the name of:
George Cook (footballer, born 1895) (1895–1980), English professional footballer
George Cook (footballer, born 1904) (1904–after 1932), English professional footballer
George Cook (moderator 1825) (1772–1845), Scottish minister
George Cook (moderator 1876) ((1812–1888), Scottish minister
George Cook (opera singer) (1925–1995), English opera singer
George Cook (rugby league), Australian rugby league footballer
George Cram Cook (1873–1924), American writer
George Hammell Cook (1818–1889), State Geologist of New Jersey and Vice President of Rutgers College
George Ramsay Cook (1931–2016), Canadian historian
George S. Cook (1819–1902), American photographer
George W. Cook (1851–1916), U.S. Representative from Colorado
George W. F. Cook (1919–2009), Vermont attorney and politician
George William Cook (1855–1931), educator at Howard University

See also
George Cooke (disambiguation)